Joseph Neal Brown (October 2, 1849 – February 1922) was an American politician. He was a Democratic member of the Mississippi State Senate, representing the state's 35th senatorial district from 1918 to 1922.

Biography 
Joseph Neal Brown was born on October 2, 1849, in Mount Pleasant, Mississippi. He was the son of George W. Brown and Ellen (Huffman) Brown. He was educated in the private schools of DeSoto County. He served as a member of the Board of Supervisors of DeSoto County, Mississippi, and he served some years as its president. He was elected to represent Mississippi's 35th senatorial district as a Democrat in the Mississippi State Senate in a 1916 special election after the resignation of incumbent senator John W. Barbee. He served in the 1918 session. In 1919, he was re-elected for the 1920–1924 term. After a two-week illness, Brown died in February 1922 at the Baptist Memorial Hospital in Memphis, Tennessee. He was succeeded in the position by B. E. Wilson.

References 

1849 births
1922 deaths
People from Olive Branch, Mississippi
Democratic Party Mississippi state senators